Louisa is a home rule-class city located at the merger of the Levisa and Tug Forks into the Big Sandy River. It is located in Lawrence County, Kentucky, in the United States, and is the seat of its county. The population was 2,467 at the 2010 census and an estimated 2,375 in 2018.

History
The origin of the city's name is unclear. Theories include that it was named for Louisa County, Virginia, after Louisa Swetnam, one of the first white children born in the area, or after a corruption of the original name of the Levisa Fork, as it was originally written and spoken as the "Louisa Fork." Others claim that the Levisa Fork is named for Levite connections to the Cherokee and other native tribes prior to later European contact. An 1856 map still shows the river under the name "Louisa." Virginia, Carolina and other English colonial-linked settlement attempts began as early as 1790 but did not take hold until 1818. Louisa became the county seat in 1822 and a city in 1823.

About 1792 Vancouver's Station, which had been destroyed by the Native Americans in 1790, on the tongue of land between the Levisa and Tug Forks of the Big Sandy, was reestablished.  A few years later this settlement was known as "Balclutha" and is so designated on early maps of the state.

During the Civil War, Union troops under future president James A. Garfield occupied the city from December 1861 until the end of the war, despite several Confederate takeover attempts.

The Chattaroi Railroad (now a part of CSX) connected to Louisa in 1881. The city is also served by US 23. The first needle dam constructed in the United States was completed just north of town in 1896.

The city was home to Fred M. Vinson, the 13th Chief Justice of the United States, and to the York Brothers, a popular country music act of the 1940s and 1950s.

Geography
Louisa is located in eastern Lawrence County at  (38.112054, -82.605796). Its eastern border is the Levisa Fork, and its northern border is the Big Sandy River, which also serves as the Kentucky–West Virginia border.

U.S. Route 23 passes through the western side of the city, leading north  down the valley of the Big Sandy River to Ashland on the Ohio River and southwest  to Staffordsville. Kentucky Route 3 passes through the center of Louisa on Madison Street; KY 3 leads northwest  to Fallsburg and southeast up the valley of the Tug Fork and Rockcastle Creek  to Inez. Kentucky Route 32 leads southwest from Louisa  to Blaine. West Virginia Route 37 leads east across the Tug Fork to Fort Gay, West Virginia.

Climate
The climate in this area is characterized by relatively high temperatures and evenly distributed precipitation throughout the year.  According to the Köppen Climate Classification system, Louisa has a Humid subtropical climate, abbreviated "Cfa" on climate maps.

Points of interest
The bridge from Louisa, in eastern Lawrence County, to Fort Gay, West Virginia, is something of a geographic and architectural oddity. The quarter-mile concrete span spans two forks of the Big Sandy River, connects two states and has a right turn at its halfway point, which connects traffic to the Point Section neighborhood of Louisa.

"The Paveillon" (or more commonly known as "The Birdhouse") is a five story tall spire structure that serves as a gas station, rest stop, and country music museum along U.S. Route 23 as it passes through the western side of the city. The structure was inspired by the Hotel del Coronado in San Diego, California and the Grand Floridian Resort in Orlando, Florida. 

The Fred M. Vinson Museum and Welcome Center is the historical boyhood home of the 13th Chief Justice of the Supreme Court, and the first jail to be built in Lawrence County. It is located on the corner of Madison St. and Vinson Ave. The grave of Chief Justice Vinson can also be found at Pinehill Cemetery.

Culture
Every second weekend in September, Louisa hosts the regional Septemberfest that features several local and national acts performing for three days, as well as arts and crafts on the northwestern side of town, and the many food vendors featuring Southeastern cuisine.

Demographics

As of the census of 2000, there were 2,018 people, 927 households, and 548 families residing in the city. The racial makeup of the city was 98.61% White, 0.50% African American, 0.05% Native American, 0.10% Asian, 0.05% from other races, and 0.69% from two or more races. Hispanic or Latino of any race were 0.20% of the population.

There were 927 households, out of which 26.5% had children under the age of 18 living with them, 41.3% were married couples living together, 15.2% had a female householder with no husband present, and 40.8% were non-families. 38.1% of all households were made up of individuals, and 18.4% had someone living alone who was 65 years of age or older. The average household size was 2.16 and the average family size was 2.84.

In the city, the population was spread out, with 22.1% under the age of 18, 10.0% from 18 to 24, 25.9% from 25 to 44, 23.9% from 45 to 64, and 18.1% who were 65 years of age or older. The median age was 39 years. For every 100 females, there were 79.5 males. For every 100 females age 18 and over, there were 74.1 males.

The median income for a household in the city was $16,690, and the median income for a family was $24,474. Males had a median income of $30,000 versus $21,250 for females. The per capita income for the city was $16,746. About 27.5% of families and 32.8% of the population were below the poverty line, including 46.9% of those under age 18 and 17.4% of those age 65 or over.

Education

Secondary schools
 Lawrence County High School

Primary schools
 Louisa East Elementary School
 Louisa West Elementary School
 Louisa Middle School
 The Millard School

Public library
Louisa has a lending library, the Lawrence County Public Library.

Notable people
Tyler Childers, folk/country/Americana singer
Cliff Fannin, baseball player
Chandler Shepherd (born 1992), baseball pitcher
Frederick M. Vinson, Chief Justice of the United States, 1946-1953
Jason Michael, NFL Coach
Noah Thompson, 2022 American Idol Winner

References

External links
 City of Louisa official website
 Lawrence County Schools

 

Cities in Kentucky
Cities in Lawrence County, Kentucky
County seats in Kentucky
Populated places established in 1822
1822 establishments in Kentucky